Estonian Golf Association (abbreviation EGA) is one of the sport governing bodies in Estonia which deals with golf.

EGA is established on 15 October 1992. EGA is a member of International Golf Federation (IGF) and Estonian Olympic Committee.

References

External links
 

Sports governing bodies in Estonia
National members of the European Golf Association
Sports organizations established in 1992
Golf in Estonia